Henry Booth (died 1446), of Arleston and Sinfin, Derbyshire, was an English politician.

He was a Member (MP) of the Parliament of England for Derbyshire in 1420, 1423, 1425 and 1427.

References

Year of birth missing
1446 deaths
People from South Derbyshire District
Politicians from Derby
English MPs 1420
English MPs 1423
English MPs 1425
English MPs 1427